General elections were held in the Netherlands on 12 June 1883.

Results

By district
  Liberal  
  Conservative  
  Anti-Revolutionary  
  Catholic

Notes

References

General elections in the Netherlands
Netherlands
1883 in the Netherlands
June 1883 events
Election and referendum articles with incomplete results